Netscape Composer is a WYSIWYG HTML editor initially developed by Netscape Communications Corporation in 1997, and packaged as part of the Netscape Communicator, Netscape 6 and Netscape 7 range of Internet suites. In addition, Composer can also view and edit HTML code, preview pages in Netscape Navigator, check spelling, publish websites, and supports most major types of formatting.

Composer was initially developed by Netscape as a component of the company's internet suites; however, after the company was bought by AOL in 1998, further development of its codebase was made open source and overseen by the Mozilla Foundation. Subsequent releases of Netscape Composer were based upon Mozilla Composer, the same utility within the Mozilla Application Suite. 

The last version of Netscape Composer was released with the Netscape 7.2 suite. It was not included with later releases, as Mozilla decided to focus on stand-alone applications, and as such, Netscape released the stand-alone browsers Netscape Browser 8 in 2005 and Netscape Navigator 9 in 2007, both based upon the stand-alone Mozilla Firefox.

SeaMonkey, the community-driven successor suite to Mozilla Application Suite and the Netscape suites, features an HTML editor named Composer that is developed from Mozilla Composer. Nvu, KompoZer, and BlueGriffon are separate editor projects derived from Composer; the first two have been discontinued, while BlueGriffon is still under active development.

See also
List of HTML editors

External links
Netscape archive

Netscape
HTML editors
1997 software